Mokeler Creek is a  tributary of Piscasaw Creek, itself a tributary of the Kishwaukee River, in northern Illinois.

Course
It then flows directly through the city of Harvard.

Description
Mokeler Creek is 10 stream miles in length. In 1996 the Illinois Environmental Protection Agency assessed the stream for overall resource quality. It was found to have "fair" conditions, with the main contamination problems coming from agricultural run-off and construction. Additionally, the City of Harvard's wastewater treatment plant discharges effluent into Mokeler creek as it flows through the City.

References

Tributaries of the Kishwaukee River
Rivers of McHenry County, Illinois
Rivers of Illinois